Jeff Campbell is a former professional American football player who played wide receiver for the Detroit Lions and Denver Broncos.

References

1968 births
American football wide receivers
Detroit Lions players
Denver Broncos players
Colorado Buffaloes football players
Living people